The following is a partial list of English words of Indonesian origin. The loanwords in this list may be borrowed or derived, either directly or indirectly, from the Indonesian language. Some words may also be borrowed from Malay during the British colonial period in British Malaya, or during the short period of British rule in Java. However, unlike loanwords of Malay origin, some of these loanwords may be derived from languages of Indonesia such as Javanese, Sundanese, Minangkabau, Buginese, Makassarese, Acehnese, and many more.

Examples of English loanwords of Indonesian origin are those related to Indonesian culture and artforms (e.g. angklung, batik, kris and wayang), as well as words used to describe flora and fauna endemic to the Indonesian archipelago (e.g. babirusa, cockatoo, orangutan and Komodo). Other recently adopted loanwords include food related terms (e.g. agar and tempeh) and specific volcanology terms (e.g. lahar and ribu).

Animals 
 Babirusa, compound word from babi (pig) and rusa (deer)
 Banteng
 Bantam, from the town of Banten /  wahanten (Sundanese)
 Binturong
 Cassowary from kasuari (Papuan) / कास्सोवारिस् kās'sōvāris (Sanskrit)
 Cockatoo from kakatua 
 Dugong from duyung
 Gecko
 Komodo dragon, from Komodo
 Orangutan
 Pangolin from pengguling or trenggiling
 Siamang
 Tokay (gecko) from tokek
 Trepang from teripang

Plants and trees 
 Bamboo from bambu
Burahol from  burahol (Sundanese)
Champak from cempaka, derived from  campaka (Sundanese)
 Gambier from gambir
 Gutta percha from getah perca (Indonesian)
 Kapok from kapuk
 Meranti a kind of tropical tree
 Merbau a kind of tropical tree
 Paddy from padi (Indonesian)
 Pandanus from pandan
 Ramie from rami
 Rattan from rotan
 Sago from sagu
 Cajuput from kayu Putih

Fruits 
 Cempedak
 Durian
 Langsat
 Mangosteen from manggis (manggustan)
 Rambutan
 Salak, also known as Zalacca
 Papaya from pepaya

Foods 
 Agar
 Krupuk
 Rendang
 Sambal
 Satay from sate (Javanese)
 Tempeh from tempe

Clothes and textiles 
 Batik from Batik (Javanese)
 Canting from canting (Javanese)
 Gingham from genggang
 Ikat
 Koteka (Papuan)
 Sarong from sarung / சரம் caram (Tamil)
 Songket

Musical instruments 
 Angklung from  angklung  (Sundanese)
 Gamelan
 Gong from ꦒꦺꦴꦁ gong  (Javanese)

Ships 
 Junk from jong
 Proa (also 'prahu' or 'prau') from prahu (Javanese) or perahu (Indonesian) originated from Portuguese proa.

Weapons 
 Kris from keris (Javanese)
 Parang
 Sjambok from cambuk in Indonesia, where it was the name of a wooden rod for punishing slaves
 Tombac from tombak

Person name 
 Mata Hari from matahari (sun)

Units 
 Catty from கட்டி kaṭṭi (Tamil), ultimately derived from Chinese unit
 Picul: traditional Asian weight unit, derived from Javanese pikul
 Ribu: topographic prominence unit of mountain or volcano more than 1,000 metres, derived from Indonesian ribu (thousand)

Behavior and psychology 
 Amok from amuk 
 Latah

Sports 
 Bantam, from bantam chicken, ultimately Banten town
 Silat
 Sepak takraw

Others 
 Balanda to refer whiteman, from belanda (Dutchman)
 Camphor, from kapur barus ("Barus' chalk"), which refers to the port of Barus in Sumatra as the source of camphor
 Damar, plant resin
 Lahar from lahar (Javanese)
 Compound from kampung, which is Indonesian for "village".
 Warung

References 

Indonesian
 
Indonesia culture-related lists